The Guyue Bridge is an arch bridge located in Yiwu, Zhejiang province, China.

Introduction
The bridge is located in Chi'an Town, and it's about 100-meter western of the Yazhi Street (雅治街). It goes across the Dragon Creek (traditional Chinese: 龍溪, simplified Chinese: 龙溪, pinyin: Lóng Xī).

It is a single span arch bridge. The design is very special: more precisely, its structure feature is girder-arch, and the girders are arranged like ribs. Such a design can be found in the famous painting Along the River During the Qingming Festival of Song dynasty by Zhang Zeduan.

The bridge was completed in 1213, the sixth year of the Jiading Era, Southern Song dynasty. Since then it has never been rebuilt or repaired.

On the body of the bridge are engraved 12 Chinese characters: Huangsong Jiading Guiyou Jiqiu Runyue Jianzao, which literally means: Constructed in Autumn September Imperial Song Jiangding Era the Year of Guiyou ("Huang" means Imperial. "Song" reveals Song dynasty. "Jiading" is an era 1208-1224 of the Emperor Ningzong of Song. "Guiyou" is the year 1213, it's the Sexagenary cycle-way to record years in traditional Chinese calendar. "Jiqiu" means the late autumn period of a year.

See also
 Stone bridge
 Arch bridge
 Zhaozhou Bridge, a famous Chinese stone arch bridge completed in 605 AD.
 List of bridges in China

References

External links
 Detailed descriptions on the Guyue Bridge , including photos (from Hudong.com)
 A blog describing Guyue Bridge in spring 

Major National Historical and Cultural Sites in Zhejiang
Arch bridges in China
Bridges in Jinhua
Stone bridges in China
Buildings and structures completed in 1213
Song dynasty architecture
Bridges completed in the 13th century